The Toyota Urban Cruiser is an automobile nameplate used by the Japanese automobile manufacturer Toyota since 2008 for several subcompact crossover SUV models:

 Toyota Urban Cruiser Concept, a concept car showcased in 2006
 Toyota Urban Cruiser (XP110), the European version of the second-generation Toyota Ist marketed between 2008 and 2014
 Toyota Urban Cruiser (2020), a rebadged Suzuki Vitara Brezza marketed in India and Africa between 2020 and 2022
 Toyota Urban Cruiser (2023), a rebadged Suzuki Grand Vitara marketed as the Urban Cruiser Hyryder in India since 2022, and as the Urban Cruiser in Africa since 2023

Urban Cruiser
Cars introduced in 2008